The Marree Subgroup, previously described as Maree Formation and Marree Formation, is a geological subgroup in the Eromanga Basin of South Australia whose strata date back to the Aptian. The subgroup was first described as a formation by Forbes in 1966. Dinosaur remains are among the fossils that have been recovered from the formation.

An opalised plesiosaur specimen of the genus Umoonasaurus has been nicknamed 'Eric' and was described in 1998 by Schroeder. The decapod crab Dioratiopus salebrosus was described in 1980.

Vertebrate paleofauna 
Indeterminate theropod remains present in Western Australia.

Dinosaurs 

Sauropterygians

See also 
 List of dinosaur-bearing rock formations

References

Further reading 
 Schroeder, N. (1998). A review of order Pliosauria, and the description of a new, opalised pliosauroid, from the Early Cretaceous of Coober Pedy, South Australia. M.Sc. thesis, Monash University, Clayton, Victoria
 M. F. Glaessner. 1980. New Cretaceous and Tertiary crabs (Crustacea: Brachyura) from Australia and New Zealand. Transactions of the Royal Society of South Australia 104(6):171-192

Geologic formations of Australia
Cretaceous System of Australia
Early Cretaceous Australia
Albian Stage
Aptian Stage
Siltstone formations
Fossiliferous stratigraphic units of Oceania
Paleontology in South Australia